Zephyr National is Tom Fogerty's third solo album. His brother John played on the album, but recorded his parts separately from former CCR band members Doug Clifford and Stu Cook on the one song ("Mystic Isle Avalon") on which they all performed. This marked the final recording where all four members of Creedence Clearwater Revival played on the same song.

Track listing
All compositions written by Tom Fogerty
 "It's Been a Good Day"  – 2:25
 "Can You Feel It" – 2:06
 "Mystic Isle Avalon" – 2:38
 "Reggie" – 2:15
 "Money (Root the Root)" – 2:42
 "Hot Buttered Rum" – 2:04
 "Joyful Resurrection" – 3:51
 "Heartbeat" – 2:22
 "Fate" – 3:11
 "Goin' Back to Okeefenokee" – 3:26

Personnel
 Tom Fogerty – guitar, harmonica, vocals
 John Fogerty – guitar on "Mystic Isle Avalon"
 Stu Cook – bass, synthesizer, lead guitar on "Joyful Resurrection"
 Doug Clifford – drums, vocals
 Tom Phillips – guitar, pedal steel
 Gary Potterton – guitar
 Russ Gary – guitar, vocals, producer
 Stephen Funk – keyboards
 Jeff Nerell – steel drums
 Ron Stallings – saxophone
 The Stovalls – vocals

Charts

References

External links
Zephyr National in deaddisc.com

1974 albums
Tom Fogerty albums
Creedence Clearwater Revival
Fantasy Records albums